David Rooney is a Gaelic footballer playing for the Sligo county team. Rooney made his senior debut in the 2011 against Leitrim, which proved to be a shock as Sligo were knocked out.

References

1990 births
Living people
Sligo inter-county Gaelic footballers
St John's (Sligo) Gaelic footballers